"Turn Blue" is a song by American rock band The Black Keys, and the title track from their album Turn Blue. It was co-written and co-produced by the band and Danger Mouse.

The song was written in February 2013 while The Black Keys frontman Dan Auerbach and his wife Stephanie Gonis were in the midst of divorce proceedings.

Track listing
"Turn Blue" - 3:43

Charts

Release history

References

2014 singles
The Black Keys songs
2014 songs
Songs written by Dan Auerbach
Songs written by Patrick Carney
Song recordings produced by Danger Mouse (musician)
Songs written by Danger Mouse (musician)